is the 32nd studio album by Japanese singer-songwriter Miyuki Nakajima, released in November 2004.
The album contains remake versions of her compositions which came out before she created the records with Ichizo Seo, who has co-produced all of her recordings since Goodbye Girl and its lead single "Namida" in 1988.

Track listing
All songs written and composed by Miyuki Nakajima, arranged by Ichizo Seo
"" (Original version appeared on 1975 album Watashi no Koe ga Kikoemasuka
"" (Original version released as a single in 1977, and also featured on 1978 album Aishiteiru to Ittekure)
"" (Original version appeared on 1978 album Aishiteiru to Ittekure)
"" (Original version appeared on 1979 album Shin-ai Naru Mono e)
"" (Initially recorded by Tokiko Kato, Nakajima's version appeared on 1979 album Okaerinasai)
"" (Original version appeared on 1981 album Month of Parturition (Ringetsu))
"" (Original version appeared on 1982 album Kansuigyo)
"" (Original version appeared on 1982 album Kansuigyo)
"" (Original version released as a single in 1982)
"" (Original version appeared on 1983 album Hunch (Yokan))
"" (Original version appeared on 1984 album How Do You Do(Hajimemashite))
"" (Original version appeared on flip side of a 1986 single "Mikaeri Bijin")
"" (Original version appeared on 1988 album Nakajima Miyuki)

Personnel
Miyuki Nakajima – Lead and harmony vocals
Vinnie Colaiuta – Drums
Neil Stubenhaus – Electric bass
Michael Thompson – Electric guitar, acoustic guitar
Masayoshi Furukawa – Electric guitar
Jon Gilutin – Acoustic piano, electric piano, hammond organ, keyboards, hammond organ
Ichizo Seo – Keyboards
Elton Nagata – Keyboards
Keishi Urata – Synth programming, drum loop, percussion programming
Tomō Satō – Synth programming, acoustic guitar, drum loop, percussion programming
Suzie Katayama – Strings conductor
Sid Page – Violin (Concertmaster)
Joel Derouin – Violin (Concertmaster)
Eve Butler – Violin
Darius Campo – Violin
Susan Chatman – Violin
Mario De Leon – Violin
Bruce Dukov – Violin
Alyssa Park – Violin
Armen Garabedian – Violin
Benj Garabedian – Violin
Cameron Patrlck – Violin
Michele Richards – Violin
Charlie Bisharat – Violin
Peter Kent – Violin
Ruth Bruegger-Johnson – Violin
Bob Peterson – Violin
Josefina Vergara – Violin
Mark Robertson – Violin
Miwako Watanabe – Violin
John Wittenberg – Violin
Larry Corbett – Cello
Dan Smith – Cello
Stefanie Fife – Cello
Steve Richards – Cello
Rudy Stein – Cello
Bob Becker – Viola
Darrin McCann – Viola
Fumikazu Miyashita- Vocals
Kazuyo Sugimoto – Harmony vocals
Julia Waters – Backing vocals
Maxine Waters – Backing vocals
Oren Waters – Backing vocals
Carmen Twillie – Backing vocals
Maxi Anderson – Backing vocals

Chart positions

Release history

References

Miyuki Nakajima albums
2004 albums